The 1951–52 Allsvenskan was the 18th season of the top division of Swedish handball and the final season where the league did not determine the Swedish Champions. 10 teams competed in the league. IFK Kristianstad won the league, but the title of Swedish Champions was awarded to the winner of Svenska mästerskapet. SoIK Hellas and IK Baltichov were relegated.

League table

Attendance

References 

Swedish handball competitions